Travolta Fever is a 1978 compilation album featuring songs by John Travolta and was released on the Midsong International label.  This 2-record set reached No. 161 on the U.S. albums chart in the same year that the soundtrack for Grease reached No. 1.

Track listing
Side 1
 "Let Her In"
 "Never Gonna Fall in Love Again"
 "Rainbows"
 "A Girl Like You"
 "Razzamatazz"

Side 2
 "I Don't Know What I Like About You Baby"
 "Baby, I Could Be So Good At Lovin' You"
 "Big Trouble"
 "It Had To Be You"
 "Good Night, Mr. Moon"

Side 3
 "Slow Dancing"
 "You Set My Dreams To Music"
 "Whenever I'm Away from You"
 "Settle Down"
 "Back Doors Crying"

Side 4
 "Moonlight Lady"
 "All Strung Out On You"
 "Can't Let You Go"
 "Easy Evil"
 "What Would They Say"
 "Right Time of the Night"

1978 albums
1978 compilation albums
John Travolta albums